That Way may refer to:

 "I Want It That Way", song by the Backstreet Boys
 "That Way" (Lil Uzi Vert song), single by Lil Uzi Vert
 "That Way", song by Wale from Self Made Vol. 1
 "That Way", song by Shakira from Shakira

See also 
 The Way (disambiguation)